The 2004 Libertarian National Convention was held from May 28 to May 31, 2004 at the Marriott Marquis Hotel in Atlanta, Georgia. The delegates at the convention, on behalf of the U.S. Libertarian Party, nominated Michael Badnarik for president and Richard Campagna for vice president in the 2004 presidential election. The convention was televised nationally on C-SPAN.

Libertarians hold a National Convention every two years to vote on party bylaws, platform and resolutions and elect national party officers and a judicial committee. Every four years it nominates presidential and vice presidential candidates.

Speakers

Those which attended include:
 Michael Badnarik, activist
 Gary Nolan, radio host
 Aaron Russo, businessman and filmmaker
 Ron Paul, former Libertarian Presidential candidate and current Republican Congressman
 Neal Boortz, national syndicated radio talk show host
 James Bovard, author of Terrorism and Tyranny
 Sheriff Richard Mack
 David Nolan, co-founder of the Libertarian Party
 Michael Colley, retired United States Navy vice admiral
 Dean Cameron, actor
 Jim Gray, judge of the Superior Court of Orange County, California, author
 Dr. Mary Ruwart, author
 Ed Thompson, nominee for Governor of Wisconsin in 2012
 Jimmie Vaughan, musician

Voting for presidential nomination

First ballot
After the first round, a motion was passed to suspend the rules and allow only the top three candidates from the first round to proceed to the second ballot.

Second ballot
After the second round, Gary Nolan, not receiving the necessary votes to advance, endorsed Michael Badnarik.

Third ballot
After the second round of voting, Gary Nolan addressed the convention, endorsing Michael Badnarik for the 2004 nomination of the Libertarian Party.

Voting for vice presidential nomination
A separate vote was held for the vice presidential nomination.  Per convention rules, nominee Michael Badnarik addressed the crowd, however he declined to declare his preferred running mate.

First ballot
Richard Campagna of Iowa was nominated as vice presidential candidate on the first ballot.

See also
 Libertarian National Convention
 Other parties' presidential nominating conventions of 2004:
 Green
 Democratic
 Republican
 Libertarian Party of Colorado
 U.S. presidential election, 2004

References

Libertarian Party (United States) National Conventions
Libertarian National Convention
Libertarian National Convention
2004 in Atlanta
Political conventions in Georgia (U.S. state)
2004 conferences
Libertarian National Convention
Conventions in Atlanta